Antonio Fernández Resines (born 7 August 1954) professionally known as Antonio Resines, is a Spanish film and television actor known for his performance in comedy films and series.

Biography 
He was born 'by accident' on 7 August 1954 in Torrelavega, as his parents spent their Summer holidays there, but he was raised in Madrid, son of José Ramón Fernández Quevedo, lawyer, and Amalia Resines Ruiz de Rebolledo, who died on 10 July 2011. 
He studied on the Marianist Colegio Santa María del Pilar.

Resines started studying law at university, yet he dropped his studies after a year, switching to 'Sciences of the Image'. During this time, he became an acquaintance of the likes of Fernando Trueba and Óscar Ladoire.

From 2003 to 2008, he starred as leading role (Diego Serrano) in the successful (yet controversially-ended) costumbrista sit-com Los Serrano.

He was a usual collaborator in La Resistencia, and in September 2019 he was cast to El hormiguero.

Selected filmography

Film
 La pequeña Suiza (2019) as Pascual
Celda 211 (Daniel Monzón, 2009).
La Dama Boba (Manuel Iborra, 2006).
Otros días vendrán (Eduard Cortés, 2005).
El mundo alrededor (Alejandro Calvo-Sotelo, 2005).
Tánger (Juan Madrid, 2004).
Dos tipos duros (Juan Martínez Moreno, 2003).
El oro de Moscú (Jesús Bonilla, 2003).
Trileros (Antonio del Real, 2003).
Besos de gato (Rafael Alcázar, 2003).
El embrujo de Shanghai (Fernando Trueba, 2002).
Marujas asesinas (Javier Rebollo, 2002).
Al sur de Granada (Fernando Colomo, 2002).
La caja 507 (Enrique Urbizu, 2002).
El portero (Gonzalo Suárez, 2000).
Pídele cuentas al Rey (Jose Antonio Quirós, 1999).
La niña de tus ojos (Fernando Trueba, 1998).
El tiempo de la felicidad (Manuel Iborra, 1997).
Carreteras secundarias (Emilio Martínez Lázaro, 1997).
La buena estrella (Ricardo Franco, 1997).
Tranvía a la Malvarrosa (José Luis García Sánchez, 1996).
La Ley de la frontera (Adolfo Aristarain, 1995).
Todos los hombres sois iguales (Manuel Gómez Pereira, 1994).
Acción mutante (Álex de la Iglesia, 1993).
La marrana (José Luis Cuerda, 1992).
Cómo ser mujer y no morir en el intento (Ana Belén, 1991).
Todo por la pasta (Enrique Urbizu, 1991).
El baile del pato (Manuel Iborra, 1989).
El vuelo de la paloma (José Luis García Sánchez, 1989).
Amanece, que no es poco (José Luis Cuerda, 1988).
Luna de lobos (Julio Sánchez Valdés), 1987.
Moros y cristianos (Luis García Berlanga, 1987).
La vida alegre (Fernando Colomo, 1987).
Lulú de noche (Emilio Martínez Lázaro, 1986).
Sé infiel y no mires con quién (Fernando Trueba, 1985).
Sal gorda (Fernando Trueba, 1983).
La colmena (Mario Camus, 1982).
Vecinos (Alberto Bermejo, 1981).
Ópera prima (Fernando Trueba, 1980).

Television
Eva y Adán: agencia matrimonial (1990–1991)
Los ladrones van a la oficina (1993-1996)
La banda de Pérez (1997)
A las once en casa (1998–1999)
Robles Investigador (2000-2001)
Los Serrano (2003–2008)
Cheers (2011-)
Aquí Paz y después Gloria (2015) as Paco / Ángel

References

External links
 

1954 births
Living people
People from Torrelavega
Spanish male film actors
Best Actor Goya Award winners
Spanish male television actors
20th-century Spanish male actors
21st-century Spanish male actors